Bolsover Hospital was a community healthcare facility in Bolsover, Derbyshire. It was managed by Derbyshire Community Health Services NHS Foundation Trust.

History
Bolsover Hospital was built as a small single-storey building and completed in 1988. Despite efforts by local member of parliament Dennis Skinner to challenge Prime Minister David Cameron in the House of Commons to prevent closure and a strong campaign against closure organised by local people, it was confirmed in July 2017 that the hospital would close. After services had been transferred to the Castle Street Medical Centre in Bolsover in early 2019, Bolsover Hospital closed and the site was handed over to Homes England to facilitate residential development.

References

External links
Official site

Hospital buildings completed in 1988
Hospitals in Derbyshire
Hospitals established in 1988
1988 establishments in England
Bolsover
Defunct hospitals in England